Norrie may refer to:

People

Surname
 Anna Norrie (1860–1957), Swedish operetta singer
 Bill Norrie (1929–2012), Canadian politician
 Bryan Norrie (born1983), Australian rugby league footballer
 Cameron Norrie (born 1995), British tennis player
 Willoughby Norrie, 1st Baron Norrie (1893–1977), British army general
 Kenneth Norrie (born 1946), Canadian economic historian

Given name
 Norrie Davidson (1934–2022), Scottish footballer
 Norrie Fairgray (1890–?), Scottish footballer
 Norrie McCathie (1961–1996), Scottish footballer
 Norrie MacIver, Scottish musician
 Norrie Martin (1939–2013), Scottish footballer
 Norrie May-Welby, first legally genderless person in Australia
 Norrie Muir (1948–2019), Scottish climber
 Norrie Paramor (1914–1979), British record producer
 Norrie Rowan (born c. 1951), Scottish international rugby union player

Places
 Norrie, Colorado, United States
 Norrie, Wisconsin, United States
 Norrie (community), Wisconsin, an unincorporated community

Other
 Norrie disease, an eye disorder
 Elinore "Norrie" Calvert-Hill, a fictional character in Under the Dome

See also
 

Lists of people by nickname